Richard Stevens may refer to:
 Richard Stevens (MP) (1702–1776), English politician, MP for Callington 1761–68
 Richard Stevens (tennis), American tennis player
 Richard Stevens (lawyer) (1868–1919), American lawyer and real estate developer
 Richard Y. Stevens, North Carolina politician
 W. Richard Stevens (1951–1999), author of Unix and networking books
 Richard Stevens (cartoonist), author of the webcomic Diesel Sweeties
 Richard Henry Stevens (1893–1967), British intelligence officer captured during the Venlo incident
 R. J. S. Stevens (1757–1837), London composer-organist; Gresham Professor of Music from 1801
 Richard Stevens (Falkland Islands politician) (born 1955), Falkland Islands politician
 Richard L. Stevens, U.S. Army Corps of Engineers officer
Rick Stevens (Donald Stevenson, born 1940), first lead vocalist of Tower of Power

See also
Richard Steevens (1653–1710), physician, gave rise to Dublin's Dr Steevens' Hospital 
Richard Stephens (disambiguation)
Stevens (surname)